Doluca is a village in the Çayırlı District, Erzincan Province, Turkey. The village had a population of 25 in 2021.

References 

Villages in Çayırlı District